The Canadian Independent Telephone Association, now the Canadian Independent Telecommunications Association, is a nationwide association of companies that provide telephone service within British Columbia, Ontario and Quebec, founded in 1905.

Active Members List 

(as of July 2014)
 Iristel
 Brooke Telecom
 Bruce Telecom
 CityWest Tel
 Cochrane Telecom Service
 Coop Tel
 Execulink Telecom
 Gosfield North Communications
 Hay Communications
 Huron Telecommunications
 La Cie de Telephone de Courcelles
 La Compagnie Telephone St-Victor
 La Compagnie Telephone Upton
 Lansdowne Rural Telephone
 Mornington Communications
 Nexicom Telecommunications
 Nexicom Telephones
 North Frontenac Telephone Company
 North Renfrew Telephone Company
 Ontera
 Quadro Communications
 Roxborough Telephone Co. Ltd.
 Sogetel
 TBayTel
 Telephone Guevremont
 Telephone de St-Ephrem
 Tuckersmith Communications
 Wightman Telecom
 WTC Communications

References

External links 
 Website

See also
 Stentor Alliance
 List of Canadian telephone companies
 List of Canadian mobile phone companies

1905 establishments in Canada
Telecommunications companies of Canada
Telecommunications organizations